Kyckr is a business register to help with know your customer (KYC) processes for anti-money laundering regulations. It was established in Ireland but is now a publicly traded company on the Australian Securities Exchange with operations in Ireland and Australia.

History
The company was established in Waterford, Ireland in 2007 by Ben Cronin and Rob Leslie. 

The Financial Times reported that Kyckr had a net fall in income of AUS$3.45 million in 2017.

In 2018 Kyckr was a participant in the International AML & CTF Techsprint run by the UK Financial Conduct Authority, in conjunction with 12 International supervisory and law enforcement agencies

Operations
The company provides data access technology for know your customer (KYC) in financial services and supply chain. It assists banks and other businesses to meet anti-terrorism finance, anti money laundering and other laws and regulations that require the identification of potential criminal money movement.

Kyckr's customers are primarily financial companies.

References 

2007 establishments in Australia
Anti-money laundering measures
Financial regulation in Australia